Rhenium compounds are compounds formed by the transition metal rhenium (Re). Rhenium can form in many oxidation states, and compounds are known for every oxidation state from -3 to +7 except +2, although the oxidation states +7, +6, +4, and +2 are the most common. Rhenium is most available commercially as salts of perrhenate, including sodium and ammonium perrhenates. These are white, water-soluble compounds. Tetrathioperrhenate anion [ReS4]−  is possible.

Chalcogenides

Oxides 

Rhenium(IV) oxide (or rhenium dioxide) is an oxide of rhenium, with the formula ReO2. This gray to black crystalline solid is a laboratory reagent that can be used as a catalyst. It adopts the rutile structure. It forms via comproportionation:
2 Re2O7  +  3 Re    →   7 ReO2
Single crystals are obtained by chemical transport, using iodine as the transporting agent. At high temperatures it undergoes disproportionation. It forms perrhenates with alkaline hydrogen peroxide and oxidizing acids. In molten sodium hydroxide it forms sodium rhenate.

Rhenium(VI) oxide, or rhenium trioxide, is another oxide of rhenium. It is the only stable group 7 trioxide. It has an appearance somewhat like copper. It can be formed by reducing rhenium(VII) oxide with carbon monoxide at 200 °C or elemental rhenium at 400 °C. Re2O7 can also be reduced with dioxane. Rhenium trioxide crystallizes with a primitive cubic unit cell, with a lattice parameter of 3.742 Å (374.2 pm). The structure of ReO3 is similar to that of perovskite (ABO3), without the large A cation at the centre of the unit cell. Each rhenium center is surrounded by an octahedron defined by six oxygen centers. These octahedra share corners to form the 3-dimensional structure.  The coordination number of O is 2, because each oxygen atom has 2 neighbouring Re atoms.

Rhenium(VII) oxide, or rhenium heptoxide, is another oxide of rhenium. It is the anhydride form of perrhenic acid, and is the raw material for all rhenium compounds. Solid Re2O7 consists of alternating octahedral and tetrahedral Re centres. Upon heating, the polymer cracks to give molecular (nonpolymeric) Re2O7.  This molecular species closely resembles manganese heptoxide, consisting of a pair of ReO4 tetrahedra that share a vertex, i.e., O3Re–O–ReO3.

Other chalcogenides 

Rhenium disulfide is a sulfide with the formula ReS2. It has a layered structure where atoms are strongly bonded within each layer. The layers are held together by weak Van der Waals bonds,  and can be easily peeled off from the bulk material. It is a two-dimensional (2D) group VII transition metal dichalcogenide (TMD). ReS2 was isolated down to monolayers which is only one unit cell in thickness for the first time in 2014. ReS2 is found in nature as the mineral rheniite. It can be synthesized from the reaction between rhenium and sulfur at 1000 °C, or the decomposition of rhenium(VII) sulfide at 1100 °C:

Re + 2 S → ReS2
Re2S7 → 2 ReS2 + 3 S

Rhenium diselenide (ReSe2) also has a layered structure, although, contrary to the other dichalcogenides, rhenium ditelluride does not. In addition, rhenium also forms a heptoxide, which can be produced by the direct reaction of those elements, or through the reaction of ReO4− and H2S in 4N HCl.

Perrhenates 

The perrhenate ion is the anion with the formula , or a compound containing this ion. The perrhenate anion is tetrahedral, being similar in size and shape to perchlorate and the valence isoelectronic permanganate.  The perrhenate anion is stable over a broad pH range and can be precipitated from solutions with the use of organic cations.  At normal pH, perrhenate exists as metaperrhenate, but at high pH mesoperrhenate forms.  Perrhenate, like its conjugate acid perrhenic acid, features rhenium in the oxidation state of +7  with a d0 configuration. Solid perrhenate salts takes on the color of the cation. These salts are prepared by oxidation of rhenium compounds with nitric acid followed by neutralization of the resulting perrhenic acid. Addition of tetrabutylammonium chloride to aqueous solutions of sodium perrhenate gives tetrabutylammonium perrhenate, which is soluble in organic solvents.

Halides 

The most common rhenium chlorides are ReCl6, ReCl5, ReCl4, and ReCl3. The structures of these compounds often feature extensive Re-Re bonding, which is characteristic of this metal in oxidation states lower than VII. Salts of [Re2Cl8]2− feature a quadruple metal-metal bond. Although the highest rhenium chloride features Re(VI), fluorine gives the d0 Re(VII) derivative rhenium heptafluoride. Bromides and iodides of rhenium are also well known.

Like tungsten and molybdenum, with which it shares chemical similarities, rhenium forms a variety of oxyhalides. The oxychlorides are most common, and include ReOCl4, ReOCl3.

Rhenium(III) chloride (ReCl3 or sometimes written as Re3Cl9), is a dark-red hygroscopic solid that is insoluble in ordinary solvents. It can be prepared by the thermal decomposition of rhenium(V) chloride. It is an early example of a cluster compound with metal-metal bonds. Rhenium(III) bromide also adopts the same structure, and is a black lustrous crystalline solid. It can be obtained by the direct reaction between rhenium metal and bromine at 500 ˚C under nitrogen:

 6 Re + 9 Br2 → 2 Re3Br9

Organometallic compounds 

Dirhenium decacarbonyl is a common entry point to other rhenium carbonyls. The general patterns are similar to the related manganese carbonyls. It is possible to reduce this dimer with sodium amalgam to Na[Re(CO)5] with rhenium in the formal oxidation state −1. Bromination of dirhenium decacarbonyl gives bromopentacarbonylrhenium(I), then reduced with zinc and acetic acid to pentacarbonylhydridorhenium:

Re2(CO)10 + Br2 → 2 Re(CO)5Br
Re(CO)5Br + Zn + HOAc → Re(CO)5H + ZnBr(OAc)

Bromopentacarbonylrhenium(I) is readily decarbonylated.  In refluxing water, it forms the triaquo cation:
Re(CO)5Br + 3 H2O → [Re(CO)3(H2O)3]Br + 2 CO

With tetraethylammonium bromide Re(CO)5Br reacts to give the anionic tribromide:
Re(CO)5Br + 2 NEt4Br → [NEt4]2[Re(CO)3Br3] + 2 CO

Rhenium forms a variety of alkyl and aryl derivatives, often with pi-donor coligands such as oxo groups.  Well known is methylrhenium trioxide ("MTO"), CH3ReO3 a volatile, colourless solid, a rare example of a stable high-oxidation state metal alkyl complex.  This compound has been used as a catalyst in some laboratory experiments. It can be prepared by many routes, a typical method is the reaction of Re2O7 and tetramethyltin:
Re2O7 + (CH3)4Sn → CH3ReO3 + (CH3)3SnOReO3

Analogous alkyl and aryl derivatives are known. Although PhReO3 is unstable and decomposes at –30 °C, the corresponding sterically hindered mesityl and 2,6-xylyl derivatives (MesReO3 and 2,6-(CH3)2C6H3ReO3) are stable at room temperature.  The electron poor 4-trifluoromethylphenylrhenium trioxide (4-CF3C6H4ReO3) is likewise relatively stable. MTO and other organylrhenium trioxides catalyze oxidation reactions with hydrogen peroxide as well as olefin metathesis in the presence of a Lewis acid activator.  Terminal alkynes yield the corresponding acid or ester, internal alkynes yield diketones, and alkenes give epoxides. MTO also catalyses the conversion of aldehydes and diazoalkanes into an alkene.

Rhenium is also able to make complexes with fullerene ligands such as Re2(PMe3)4H8(η2:η2C60).

One of the first transition metal hydride complexes to be reported was (C5H5)2ReH.  A variety of half-sandwich compounds have been prepared from (C5H5)Re(CO)3 and (C5Me5)Re(CO)3.  Notable derivatives include the electron-precise oxide (C5Me5)ReO3 and (C5H5)2Re2(CO)4.

See also 
 Perrhenate
 Perrhenic acid
 Rhenium

References 

Rhenium
Rhenium compounds
Chemical compounds by element